Acacia triptycha is a shrub or tree of the genus Acacia and the subgenus Plurinerves that is endemic to an area of south western Australia.

Description
Like most species it has phyllodes rather than true leaves. It blooms from June to January and produces yellow flowers.

Taxonomy
The species was first formally described by the botanist George Bentham in 1864 as a part of the work Flora Australiensis. It was reclassified by Leslie Pedley in 2003 as Racosperma triptychum then transferred back to genus Acacia in 2006.

Distribution
It is native to an area along the south coast in the South West, Great Southern and Goldfields-Esperance regions of Western Australia where it is commonly situated among granite outcrops and on hills and rises growing in gravelly clay or sand or sandy soils with laterite or quartzite  or granite. The range of the plant extends from around Busselton in the west then scattered along the south coast with the bulk of the population found between Mount Frankland out to  Cape Arid National Park in the east.

See also
List of Acacia species

References

triptycha
Acacias of Western Australia
Taxa named by George Bentham
Plants described in 1864